Dord is a word accidentally created via an error in lexicography.

Dord may also refer to:

 Dord (instrument), a bronze horn native to Ireland
 Dominique Dord (born 1959), a member of the National Assembly of France

See also
 Dordt (disambiguation)